The Pyrénées International Women's Cup, also known previously as Femení Cup and International Women's Cup, was an annual friendly women's football competition for charitable purposes held between 2006 and 2012.

The IWC's first four editions were carried out in Catalonia, Spain with Sitges serving as host in 2006 and 2007, Salou in 2008 and 2009, and Tarragona in 2010. The tournament was discontinued in 2011, but a last edition was held the following year in Andorra. RCD Espanyol and Montpellier HSC are the most successful teams in the competition with two titles each.

List of champions
 2006  Espanyol
 2007  Espanyol
 2008  Montpellier
 2009  Rayo Vallecano
 2010  Montpellier
 2012  Levante

Results

2007

Group stage

Final

2008

Group stage

Final

2009

Group stage

Final

2010

Group stage

Final

2012

Group stage

Final

References

Women's football friendly trophies
Recurring sporting events established in 2006
Football in Andorra
Sports competitions in Andorra